The buccinator muscle is a muscle at the side of the face.

Buccinator may also refer to:

 Buccinator artery ("buccal" in modern sources)
 Buccinator lymph node
 Buccinator nerve ("buccal" in modern sources)
 An ancient Roman buccina player
 A Slavic commander at the Battle of Yarmouk